Ramchandra Singh is an Indian politician from the Indian National Congress. He is the state legislative assembly member from Manika 2019.

References

Living people
21st-century Indian politicians
Lok Sabha members from Jharkhand
People from Latehar district
Indian National Congress politicians from Jharkhand
Date of birth missing (living people)
Place of birth missing (living people)
Year of birth missing (living people)